The following is a list of former Buddhists who no longer identify as such, organized by their current religious affiliation or ideology.

Christianity

Hinduism
 Mihirakula – Huna ruler
Rajasinghe I – Sri Lankan king who conquered Kandy
 Rishabhadatta – Satrap viceroy
 Rudradaman I – Satrap ruler and conqueror of the Satavahanas

Islam
 The Barmakid family – originally the guardians of the great Buddhist shrine near Balkh, upon conversion they became "the greatest family" in the early Abbasid caliphate
 Muhammad ibn Suri – king of the Ghurid dynasty from the 10th-century to 1011
 Mahmud Ghazan – seventh ruler of the Ilkhanate
 Korguz – was a Uyghur governor of Khorasan during the reign of the Mongol ruler Ogedei Khan
 Muhammad Khodabandeh – eighth Ilkhaid dynasty ruler in Iran from 1304 to 1316
 Mubarak Shah – head of the ulus of the Chagatai Khanate (1252–1260, March–September 1266)
 Donei Kalaminjaa – king of the Maldives
 Tarmashirin – Khan of the Chagatai Khanate following Duwa Timur
 Hussein Ye – Islamic scholar of Chinese Malaysian descent whose lectures are frequently aired on Peace TV

References

 Buddhists
Buddhists, former